Yusuf Jamall Scott (November 30, 1976 – November 9, 2019) was an American football offensive guard who played three seasons in the National Football League (NFL). He played college football for the University of Arizona, and was recognized as an outstanding offensive lineman during his junior year.

College career
Scott played college football at the University of Arizona as offensive linebacker under Coach Dick Tomey from 1996-1998.  He was made captain during the Wildcats' 12-1 season in 1998, and helped them get to the Holiday Bowl in San Diego where they defeated the Nebraska Cornhuskers 23-20. The Arizona Wildcats finished No. 4 in the AP Top 25 poll, and the Morris Trophy, awarded to the best offensive and defensive linebackers in a season, as selected by opposing players, was won by Scott that year. He was an All-Pac-10 selection, as well. During his senior year, he declared for the NFL and was drafted in the fifth round by the Arizona Cardinals.

Professional career
Scott played offensive guard for the Arizona Cardinals of the National Football League between 1999 and 2001. In 2002, he played for the Berlin Thunder of NFL Europe. That year, the Thunder reached World Bowl X, where they defeated the Rhein Fire 26-20 in front of a record 53,109 fans, winning the NFL Europe championship for the second year in a row.

References

Arizona Wildcats football players
Arizona Cardinals players
Place of death missing
American football offensive linemen
1976 births
2019 deaths
Sportspeople from Harris County, Texas
Players of American football from Texas
People from La Porte, Texas
La Porte High School (Texas) alumni